Ashapura Mata is an aspect of Devi, a Hindu goddess. She is one of the kuladevis of Kutch, and the Jadeja clan inhabiting the area. She is a goddess regarded to fulfill the wishes of her adherents. In her iconography, the goddess is said to have 7 pairs of eyes.

Her temples are mainly found in Rajasthan ,Gujaratand Madhya Pradesh. She is considered to be an expansion of goddess Shakambhari Devi.

Veneration
She is a kuladevi of numerous communities in Gujarat.

Kutch
She is the kuladevi of Kutchi Jadeja Rajputs, Bhanushali, Gosar & Poladia community. The Patels of charotar in piplav also worships ashapuri mata as kuldevi.

Central Gujarat
Chauhan, Baria Rajputs like Purabia Chouhans also worship her as a kuladevi. The Deora Rajputs also worship her as their kuladevi. The Brahmin communities like Billore, Gaur Lata Thanki, Pandit and Dave Pushkarna, Sompura Salat also worship her as a kuladevi. The Vaishya community Vijayvargiya worships her. The Brahma Kshatri caste worships her as their kuladevi.

South Gujarat
The Lohanas worship her as their kuladevi.

Saurashtra
The Lohanas  worship her as their kuladevi.

Sindhis like the Khichda group, worship Ashapura Mata as their kuladevi. In Gujarat Junaghad, Devchandani Parivar worship her as kuladevi, where her temple is located beside Uparkot.

Temples

As said earlier, the main and original temple of Ashapura Mata, is located at Mata no Madh in Kutch, where she is worshiped as kuladevi of Jadeja rulers of Kutch and main guardian deity of region. The original temple located 80 km from Bhuj, and apparently thousands of years old was renovated around 1300 AD by Karad Vanias, who were ministers in court of Lakho Fulani, ruler of Kutch. The deity was later adapted as kuladevi by Jadeja rulers, when they won battles, with her blessings. Every year at Navratri annual fair at Mata no Madh, lakhs of devotees turn up to pay their respects to the goddess form all over Gujarat and even Mumbai. Another temple is also at Bhuj, located within fortified town, which was originally capital of Kingdom of Kutch.

Her temples are also found in other Jadeja domains of Rajkot, Jasdan, Morbi, Gondal, Jamnagar, Ghumli, where the Jadejas, who migrated from Kutch, built her temples and installed her as clan deity.

In Ghumli, in the Barda hills, Gujarat, this is when Maa Shakti kills a demon on request of a Sati and she request Maa too reside on the hills and named her Maa Ashapura.  This is the First temple of Mataji. Maa Ashapura is still heard and also hears Maa's lion's roar.

Ashapura Mataji's temple is in the Gadhkada village in Amreli district. Every 1st day of Navratri, lot of people come there for Mataji's Yagna.

In Rajasthan, her temples are in Pokhran, Modran and Nadol. In Mumbai also there is a famous temple of Ashapura Mata.

In Bangalore, there is a temple dedicated to her named "Sh. Ashapura Mataji Mandir" that is located near Bannerghatta National Park.
 
In Pune, there is temple near Gangadham on Katraj Kondhwa Road. In Thane also a famous Ashapura Temple located near Kapurvadi.

See also
 Mata no Madh

References

Hindu goddesses
Mother goddesses
Charan
Tutelary goddesses
Culture of Kutch
Hindu folk deities